The Other Side is the eighth studio album by country singer Billy Ray Cyrus. It is also the only album he recorded for the Word Records label. Three singles were released from the album, "Always Sixteen", "Face of God", and the title track. Although "Always Sixteen" failed to enter the Hot Country Songs chart, "Face of God" and "The Other Side" peaked at number 54 and number 45, respectively.

Track listing

Personnel

 Bekka Bramlett – background vocals
 Pat Buchanan – electric guitar
 Kim Carnes – background vocals
 Billy Ray Cyrus – lead vocals, background vocals
 Dan Dugmore – slide guitar
 Wendi Foy Green – background vocals
 Kevin Haynie – banjo
 John Barlow Jarvis – Hammond organ, piano
 Paul Leim – drums, tambourine
 B. James Lowry – acoustic guitar
 Richard Marx – background vocals
 Brent Mason – electric guitar
 Gene Miller – background vocals
 Greg Morrow – drums
 Gordon Mote – Hammond organ, strings, synthesizer
 Kim Parent – background vocals
 Dave Pomeroy – bass guitar
 Michael Rhodes – bass guitar
 Joe Scaife – background vocals
 Chance Scoggins – background vocals
 Terry Shelton – acoustic guitar
 Harry Stinson – background vocals
 Neil Thrasher – background vocals
 Ray C. Walker – background vocals
 Billy Joe Walker Jr. – electric guitar, gut string guitar
 Denise Walls – background vocals
 Lonnie Wilson – drums
 Glenn Worf – bass guitar
 Curtis Young – background vocals
 Jonathan Yudkin – fiddle

Chart performance

Album

Singles

2003 albums
Billy Ray Cyrus albums
Word Records albums
Albums produced by Billy Joe Walker Jr.